Farid Khan may refer to:

 Farid Khan (field hockey) (born 1936), Hong Kong Olympic field hockey player
 Farid Khan (politician) (died 2013), Pakistani politician
 Muhammad Farid Khan (1904–1969), last ruling Nawab of the princely state of Amb
 Sher Shah Suri (1486–1545), birth name Farid Khan, Pashtun emperor, founder of the Sur Empire in northern South Asia